Mountfortescue Hillfort is a National Monument consisting of a hillfort with tumuli located in County Meath, Ireland.

Location

Description
A hillfort is a circular area surrounding a hilltop tumulus (barrow mound), defined by an earthen bank with an external ditch.

The Ordnance Survey records a circular enclosure (about 180 yards in diameter) with a mound at the Mountfortescue site. The archaeological monument consists of Mountfortescue Ringditch, Tumulus & Hillfort. The barrow cemetery at Slieve Breagh and excavation of a Neolithic settlement suggest the area had been a scene of activity throughout prehistory.

References

Archaeological sites in County Meath
National Monuments in County Meath